John Hay (25 November 1873 – 21 April 1959) was a British cardiologist.

He was born in Birkenhead, Lancashire, the son of a Scottish architect and educated at the Liverpool Institute and the Victoria University of Manchester, qualifying M.B. in 1896.

From 1900 to 1903 he was medical tutor and registrar at the Liverpool Royal Infirmary. In 1905 he identified a form of second degree AV block. In 1907 he was appointed Assistant Physician and set up the first specialised heart department in the north of England.

During World War I he served at the 1st Western General Hospital, becoming a lieutenant-colonel in the Royal Army Medical Corps.

He was elected a Fellow of the Royal College of Physicians in 1915  and in 1923 delivered their Bradshaw Lecture on Prognosis in Angina Pectoris.  In 1924 he was appointed Professor of Medicine (part-time) at the University of Liverpool. He retired to live at Bowness in the Lake District, where he died in 1959.

He had married in 1906 Agnes Margaret Duncan, daughter of William Duncan of Tyldesley, Lancashire. They had two sons and two daughters.

References

1873 births
1959 deaths
People from Birkenhead
British cardiologists
Fellows of the Royal College of Physicians
Royal Army Medical Corps officers
People educated at Liverpool Institute High School for Boys